Gajrowskie  is a village in the administrative district of Gmina Wydminy, within Giżycko County, Warmian-Masurian Voivodeship, in northern Poland.

Notable residents
 Erwin Blask (1910-1999), German athlete

References

Gajrowskie